Homalopteroides modestus is a species of ray-finned fish in the genus Homalopteroides. It can be found in lower Myanmar and Thailand.

References

Balitoridae
Fish described in 1890